John Burnham may refer to:

 John Burnham (cricketer) (1839–1914), English cricketer
 John Burnham (submarine designer) (1917–1957), designer of USS Nautilus
 John Chynoweth Burnham (1929–2017), American historian
 John Fremont Burnham (1856–?), member of the Wisconsin State Assembly
 John Burnham (Canadian politician) (1842–1897), Canadian physician and politician from Ontario
 John Hampden Burnham (1860–1940), Canadian politician and lawyer
 John de Burnham (died 1363), English born judge and official in Ireland
 Jack Burnham (footballer) (John Robert Burnham, 1896–1973), English footballer

See also
 John Brunham, merchant and mayor of King's Lynn